Nicole Besnard (1928–2017) was a French stage and film actress.  She starred in several films during the 1950s before retiring.

Selected filmography
 Au royaume des cieux (1949)
 Beauty and the Devil (1950)
 They Were Five (1952)
 Dortoir des grandes (1953)
 Naked in the Wind (1953)
 Sur le banc (1954)
 Leguignon the Healer (1954)
 The Big Flag (1954) 
 The Blue Danube (1955)

References

Bibliography
 Fritsche, Maria. Homemade Men In Postwar Austrian Cinema: Nationhood, Genre and Masculinity . Berghahn Books, 2013.
 Pym, John. Time Out Film Guide. Penguin Books, 2002.

External links

1928 births
2017 deaths
Actresses from Grenoble
French film actresses
French stage actresses